ㅞ (we) is one of the Korean hangul. The Unicode for ㅞ is U+315E.

References

Hangul jamo
Vowel letters